Zdravko Chavdarov (Bulgarian: Здравко Чавдаров; born 24 January 1981) is a Bulgarian footballer, currently playing as a goalkeeper for Rakovski.

Career
Zdravko started his career in Maritsa. In 2004, he moved to Rodopa on a free transfer and spent 4 years there. After the promotion of Sliven 2000 to the Bulgarian top division, he joined them and was first-choice goalkeeper for the whole 2008/09 season.

CSKA Sofia
On 24 June 2009, Chavdarov signed with CSKA Sofia along with his teammates Ivan Stoyanov, Kostadin Stoyanov and Kosta Yanev. On 30 July 2009, he managed a clean sheet in his official debut for the Armymen in a 1–0 home win against Northern Irish side Derry City. However, his debut for CSKA in the league was postponed after he sustained a head injury in the return leg against the Northern Irish team. Chavdarov subsequently lost his place in the first team in favour of Ivan Karadzhov, following the latter's convincing displays. However, after Karadzhov started running through a bad patch of form, Chavdarov finally made his first appearance in the league for CSKA on 1 November 2009, in a 0–2 away loss to Litex Lovech. On 27 March 2010, he played in his first Eternal Derby against Levski Sofia and kept a clean sheet for a 0–0 draw.

References
 Quadruple from Sliven signed with CSKA

1981 births
Living people
Bulgarian footballers
FC Maritsa Plovdiv players
PFC Rodopa Smolyan players
OFC Sliven 2000 players
PFC CSKA Sofia players
FC Botev Vratsa players
FC Lyubimets players
First Professional Football League (Bulgaria) players

Association football goalkeepers